Čajle is a village in the municipality of Gostivar, North Macedonia.

Demographics
As of the 2021 census, Čajle had 1,236 residents with the following ethnic composition:
Albanians 1,161
Persons for whom data are taken from administrative sources 72
Macedonians 3

According to the 2002 census, the village had a total of 3070 inhabitants. Ethnic groups in the village include:

Albanians 3028
Turks 3
Macedonians 1
Others 38

References

External links

Villages in Gostivar Municipality
Albanian communities in North Macedonia

The director of primary school Cajle is Qefsere Veliu ,  the first director was Etem Aliu.